Quand j'avais 5 ans je m'ai tué (When I was five, I killed myself) is a French film directed by Jean-Claude Sussfeld, released in 1994.

Synopsis

Gil, an eight-year-old child, is in a 1950s French psychological hospital, "due to what he did to Jessica".

He tells Dr Edouard Valmont about his conflict with authority and his strong relationship with Jessica, his classmate. The doctor befriends and trusts Gil, despite the attempts of his superiors to prevent their friendship.

Cast
 Hippolyte Girardot : Docteur Edouard Valmont
 Patrick Bouchitey : Dr. Nevele
 Salomé Lelouch : Jessica
 Dimitri Rougeul : Gil
 Anny Romand : Mme. Cochrane
 François Clavier : Gil's Father
 Claude Duneton
 Ludovic Gadois : Martin Polaski
 Raymonde Heudeline
 Amar Ioudarene : Tignasse
 Laetitia Legrix : Anne Gendron
 Charlotte Lowe
 Dimitri Rougeul : Gil at 5 (voice)
 Antoine Du Merle : Gil at 5
 Blanche Ravalec : Gil's mother

External links
 Quand j'avais 5 ans je m'ai tué on Internet Movie Database
 Quand j'avais 5 ans je m'ai tué on AlloCiné

French drama films
1990s French films